Josette Durrieu (born 20 March 1937) is a French politician and a member of the Senate of France. She represents the Hautes-Pyrénées department and is a member of the Socialist Party.

In the Senate, Durrieu serves as vice-chairwoman of the Commission on Foreign Affairs, Defence and Armed Forces. In addition to her committee assignments, she is a member of the French-Moldavian Parliamentary Friendship Group. She is also a member of the Cour de Justice de la République.

In addition to her work in the Senate, Durrieu served as member of the French delegation to the Parliamentary Assembly of the Council of Europe from 1992 until 2017. In this capacity, she was a member of the Committee on Political Affairs and Democracy; the Committee on the Honouring of Obligations and Commitments by Member States of the Council of Europe (Monitoring Committee); the Sub-Committee on relations with the Organisation for Economic Co-operation and Development (OECD) and the European Bank for Reconstruction and Development (EBRD); the Sub-Committee on the Middle East and the Arab World; and the Sub-Committee on the Rights of Minorities. She is also the Assembly's rapporteur on Turkey. She was part of an 11-member delegation to observe the conduct of the 2016 parliamentary elections in Morocco.

Other mandates 
 Municipal councillor of Saint-Laurent-de-Neste
 Cantonal councillor of the canton of Saint-Laurent-de-Neste
 Vice president of the French delegation of the Parliamentary Assembly of the Western European Union
 President of the association of friendship France-Moldova
 Member of the Cour de Justice de la République

References

Page on the Senate website

1937 births
Living people
French Senators of the Fifth Republic
Socialist Party (France) politicians
Women members of the Senate (France)
Senators of Hautes-Pyrénées